There's Always Tomorrow is a 1956 American romantic melodrama film directed by Douglas Sirk and starring Barbara Stanwyck, Fred MacMurray, and Joan Bennett. The screenplay by Bernard C. Schoenfeld was adapted from the novel of the same name by Ursula Parrott, and is about a toymaker's unhappiness with his domestic life and developing romantic relationship with a former employee who returns to town. The film was produced by Ross Hunter for Universal Pictures, which had also produced the 1934 adaptation of Parrott's novel, and released in theaters in the United States on January 8, 1956.

Plot
Toy manufacturer Clifford Groves lives a life of routine in Pasadena. His three adolescent children, son Vinnie and daughters Ellen and Frankie, keep his wife, Marion, busy, and none of them give him much attention. On Marion's birthday, Cliff plans a rare night out with his wife, but, as Frankie has a ballet recital, he ends up eating dinner alone at home. One of his first employees, Norma Miller (now Vale) pays him a surprise visit, having been unable to get through on the telephone, which gets heavy use. They have not seen each other for twenty years, but both welcome the reunion, and they decide to use the theater tickets Cliff bought for Marion and himself. Leaving at intermission, they go to Cliff's offices, where they reminisce and catch up. Norma reveals she is divorced, but not why she quit working for Cliff so abruptly, and says she is now a dress designer and is in town to speak at a conference in nearby Palm Valley. Making tentative plans to see each other before Norma returns to New York, they separate.

That Friday, Cliff returns home, ready for a weekend trip to Palm Valley with Marion, but he discovers Frankie has sprained her ankle and Marion does not want to leave her. Marion urges Cliff to go alone, and he reluctantly agrees, mostly so he can keep a meeting that an important buyer had pressed him into scheduling.

At the resort, Cliff runs into Norma, who decided to stay on after the conference. They go horseback riding, swimming, and dancing, and, when the buyer cancels the meeting, Cliff does not mind.

Vinnie drives his girlfriend, Ann, and two friends, to Palm Valley to take advantage of the resort's pool. Instead, he learns the buyer is not there, overhears some innuendo about Cliff and Norma, and sees the pair in Norma's room, leading him to suspect Cliff is having an affair. He leaves without being seen by his father.

Back home, Vinnie tells Ellen about his suspicions. Ann cannot believe Cliff would be unfaithful, and it seems she is right when he gets home and is honest about his trip. Marion suggests Cliff invite Norma to dinner the next evening, and, when he picks Norma up, she spills the contents of her purse, revealing she carries an old picture of him with her. The dinner takes an awkward turn when Vinnie walks out and Ellen refuses to speak, but Ann makes excuses to the adults. Norma invites Marion to visit the local branch of the dress shop where she works.

After Norma leaves, Cliff tells Marion that he feels taken for granted and is tired of his unadventurous life. Marion, who is happy with her life, cannot understand him and goes to bed. Frustrated, Cliff calls Norma and, heard by Vinnie, arranges to see her, alone, the next evening. He tells Marion that he has a business meeting.

At the dress shop, Ann tries to speak with Norma, but Marion does not think the dress Norma recommended is right for a woman her age, and she and Ann leave before Ann can finish. Norma intuits what Ann wanted to talk about, however, and agrees to do an interview, rather than meet Cliff. He goes to her hotel anyway and declares his love, but she tearfully asks him to wait until the next day for her response. In the meantime, Vinnie and Ellen visit Norma and ask her to go back to New York. She angrily conveys Cliff's point of view, and Ellen acknowledges that she may have been neglecting her father, but begs Norma to not take Cliff away.

Norma goes to see Cliff at work to tell him that she is leaving. She admits she left twenty years ago because she loved him, but says they could not be happy together because he has a good life and would regret abandoning his family. Ignoring his objections, she gets in a taxi and heads to the airport.

Cliff returns home and watches the plane carrying Norma fly overhead. Marion asks if he is feeling better, having noticed his recent change of mood, and he says he is "alright now."

Cast

 Barbara Stanwyck as Norma Vale (née Miller)
 Fred MacMurray as Clifford Groves
 Joan Bennett as Marion Groves
 William Reynolds as Vinnie Groves
 Pat Crowley as Ann
 Gigi Perreau as Ellen Groves
 Jane Darwell as Mrs. Rogers
 Race Gentry as Bob
 Myrna Hansen as Ruth
 Judy Nugent as Frances "Frankie" Groves

 Paul Smith as Bellboy
 Helen Kleeb as Miss Walker
 Jane Howard as Flower Girl
 Frances Mercer as Ruth Doran
 Sheila Bromley as Woman from Pasadena
 Dorothy Bruce as Sales Manager
 Hermine Sterler as Tourist's Wife
 Fred Nurney as Tourist
 Hal Smith as Bartender

Production notes
This film was Universal's second adaptation of Ursula Parrott's novel. The earlier film, directed by Edward Sloman, had, five years before The Wizard of Oz, provided a rare leading role for character actor Frank Morgan, and featured Binnie Barnes in the Stanwyck-role and Lois Wilson in the Bennett-role.

Douglas Sirk wanted his version of There's Always Tomorrow to be shot in color, but Universal refused. The studio did, however, grant the director's request to have cinematographer Russell Metty work on the film.

The scenes in the film set at the fictional Palm Valley Inn were filmed at the Apple Valley Inn.

In the film, MacMurray says to Stanwyck: "After all these years ... it's certainly wonderful to see you again.", to which she replies: "It's wonderful to see you too." The actors had appeared as co-stars in three previous films: the 1940 Christmas romantic comedy trial film Remember the Night, the classic 1944 film noir Double Indemnity, and the 1953 western The Moonlighter.

Reception

Evaluation in film guides
Leonard Maltin's Movie Guide awarded There's Always Tomorrow 2½ stars out of 4, calling it a "sudsy but well-acted soap opera", while Steven H. Scheuer's Movies on TV gave it 3 stars out of 4, describing it as a "mordant, intelligent soaper". TimeOut Film Guide'''s Paul Taylor stated that it is "a brilliant example of his [Sirk's] mastery of lacerating irony", concluding that "her [Stanwyck's] generically-correct fairytale 'sacrifice' of self to the sanctity of the family, and the sanctioned role of the independent woman, merely intensifies the romantic agony of both dreamer victims. Tomorrow never comes."

Assigning the film 3½ stars out of 5, The Motion Picture Guide described it as "another of director Sirk's melodramatic, bitter attacks on the values of American middle-class life in the 1950s", and informs that Sirk's planned conclusion "was even darker than what appeared on the screen. The ending he filmed has MacMurray's [toy] robot marching across a table top--making a final connection between his character and Rex. The original scenario had Rex reaching the edge of the desk and toppling to the ground. After crashing to the floor, the robot would struggle through a few final kicks before the end credits rolled." In the write-up, Sirk's biographer, Michael Stern, quotes the director as having said: "In tragedy the life always ends. By being dead, the hero is at the same time rescued from life's troubles. In melodrama, he lives on--in an unhappy happy end."

Modern critics
The film has received critical acclaim from modern day critics. On Rotten Tomatoes, it has an approval rating of 86% based on 7 reviews, with an average score of 7.3/10.

Home media
Universal first released the film on DVD in 2010 as part of the "Universal Backlot Series"-release The Barbara Stanwyck Collection, a 3-disc set that included five other films: Internes Can't Take Money, The Great Man's Lady, The Bride Wore Boots, The Lady Gambles, and All I Desire (the last of which was also directed by Sirk). There's Always Tomorrow is presented in this set in a full frame (1.33:1) aspect ratio and with a 4% video speed increase (usually found in PAL region DVDs), resulting in a total runtime of 81 minutes.

In 2015, Universal released the film as a stand-alone DVD in the "Universal Vault Series", this time in its original widescreen (1.85:1) aspect ratio and with the original 84-minute runtime, though without optional English subtitles. This version of the film is also the one included in the 2018 TCM Showcase: Barbara Stanwyck DVD set, which also included The Lady Eve, Double Indemnity, and All I Desire.

On August 25, 2020, There's Always Tomorrow was released on Blu-ray in North America for the first time by Kino Lorber Studio Classics, which licensed the film from Universal. This release is presented in widescreen, has optional English subtitles, and includes the film's original trailer (in widescreen) as a bonus feature.

DVD and Blu-ray releases of the film on the international market use a slightly different widescreen transfer, and some feature a textless version of the trailer (full frame) as a bonus feature.

See also
 List of American films of 1956
 There's Always Tomorrow (1934 film)

References

External links

 
 
 
 
 There's Always Tomorrow at Rotten Tomatoes
 There's Always Tomorrow at TV Guide (1987 write-up was originally published in The Motion Picture Guide'')

American black-and-white films
1956 romantic drama films
Films directed by Douglas Sirk
Films produced by Ross Hunter
Films scored by Herman Stein
Films scored by Heinz Roemheld
Universal Pictures films
American romantic drama films
Films based on American novels
Films based on works by Ursula Parrott
1956 films
Melodrama films
1950s English-language films
1950s American films